Vingqvist or Wingqvist is a Swedish surname. Notable people with the surname include:

Karl-Gustaf Vingqvist (1883–1967), Swedish gymnast 
Sven Gustaf Wingqvist (1876–1953), Swedish engineer, inventor, and industrialist

Swedish-language surnames